Denmark was represented by the band Bamses Venner, with the song "Tænker altid på dig", at the 1980 Eurovision Song Contest, which took place on 19 April in The Hague. "Tænker altid på dig" was chosen as the Danish entry at the Dansk Melodi Grand Prix on 29 March. Other participants in the 1980 DMGP included Danish Eurovision winners Grethe Ingmann and the Olsen Brothers, and 1989 entrant Birthe Kjær.

Before Eurovision

Dansk Melodi Grand Prix 1980 
The Dansk Melodi Grand Prix 1980 was held at the Falkonér Theatre in Copenhagen, hosted by Jørgen Mylius. 12 songs took part with the winner being decided by votes from a jury made up of members of the public.

At Eurovision 
On the night of the final Bamses Venner performed 7th in the running order, following Italy and preceding Sweden. At the close of voting "Tænker altid på dig" had received 25 points, placing Denmark 14th of the 19 entries. The Danish jury awarded its 12 points to contest winners Ireland.

Voting

References 

1980
Countries in the Eurovision Song Contest 1980
Eurovision